The Nienke van Hichtum-prijs (Dutch for Nienke van Hichtum Prize) is a biennial Dutch literary award for children's literature awarded by the Jan Campert-Stichting. The award is named after children's author Nienke van Hichtum and was first awarded in 1964. 

Annet Schaap with her book Lampje is the first author to have received this award with a debut novel.

Winners 

 1964 - Gertie Evenhuis, Wij waren er ook bij
 1971 - Tonke Dragt, Torenhoog en mijlenbreed
 1972 - Jaap ter Haar, Geschiedenis van de Lage Landen
 1973 - Paul Biegel, De twaalf rovers
 1975 - Miep Diekmann, Dan ben je nergens meer
 1977 - Wim Hofman, Wim
 1979 - Henk Barnard, Laatste nacht in Jeque
 1981 - Sonia Garmers, Orkaan en Mayra
 1983 - Imme Dros, En een tijd van vrede
 1985 - Willem Wilmink, Het verkeerde pannetje
 1987 - Peter van Gestel, Ko Kruier en zijn stadsgenoten
 1989 - Ienne Biemans, Lang zul je leven
 1991 - Mensje van Keulen, Vrienden van de maan
 1993 - Margriet Heymans and Annemie Heymans, De prinses van de moestuin
 1995 - Veronica Hazelhoff, Veren
 1997 - Rita Verschuur, Vreemd land
 1999 - Eva Gerlach, Hee meneer Eland
 2001 - Ted van Lieshout, Zeer kleine liefde
 2003 - Peter van Gestel, Winterijs
 2005 - Bart Moeyaert, Dani Bennoni
 2007 - Margriet Heymans, Diep in het bos van Nergena
 2009 - Els Beerten, Allemaal willen we de hemel
 2011 - Benny Lindelauf, De hemel van Heivisj
 2013 - Jan Paul Schutten, Het raadsel van alles wat leeft
 2015 - Anna Woltz, Honderd uur nacht
 2017 - Annet Schaap, Lampje
 2019 - Gideon Samson, Zeb.
 2021 - Erna Sassen, Zonder titel

References

External links 
 Nienke van Hichtum-prijs laureates (in Dutch), Jan Campert-Stichting

Dutch literary awards
Children's literary awards
Dutch children's literature
1964 establishments in the Netherlands
Awards established in 1964